Synorthodes typhedana is a species of cutworm or dart moth in the family Noctuidae. It is found in North America.

The MONA or Hodges number for Synorthodes typhedana is 10591.

References

Further reading

 
 
 

Eriopygini
Articles created by Qbugbot
Moths described in 1976